The Howard Stern Wrap-Up Show (commonly just called The Wrap-Up Show) is a radio show that follows The Howard Stern Show on Howard 101, an uncensored channel on Sirius XM Radio. Originally hosted by Jon Hein until September 2022, it is hosted by Rahsaan and Executive producer Gary Dell'Abate, the show discusses everything that happened on that day's Stern Show with listeners and various celebrity guests. It used to have other Howard Stern employees from their back office sit in on a consistent basis, but the platform has since changed.

Because The Howard Stern Show is contractually bound to broadcast a minimum of four hours on Sirius XM, there is no set time when the show ends, or effectively when The Howard Stern Wrap-Up Show begins. Regardless, The Howard Stern Wrap-Up Show now follows the main show west coast broadcast and broadcasts for about an hour.

It used to air live on Sirius Channel 100 and 101 following the Howard Stern show but has since changed to being exclusively on Howard 101. The live broadcast airs a couple of hours after the Howard Stern Show appearing to cater to listeners on the West Coast that are Pacific standard time as the Wrap Up Show is live from New York with the exception of Rahsaan aka “The Emperor of Sternthology” who conveniently works  from The SiriusXM Hollywood Studio in Los Angeles, California. It is speculated that Rahsaan moved to Los Angeles due to the birth of his child and/or his wife's career.

Prior to 2015, The Howard Stern Wrap-Up Show was open for all show staff members to discuss topics along with Hein and Dell'Abate; however, the show now only features the hosts and a revolving panel of guests discussing The Howard Stern Show and each guest's respective promotions.

Howard Stern does not participate on the Wrap Up Show. However, there is the extremely rare exception where Howard will call in from outside of the studio. This has not happened many times as Howard typically will address noteworthy moments from the Wrap Up Show on his live Howard Stern Show broadcast.

Starting September 2022, The Wrap-Up Show lineup changed from featuring Jon Hein, Gary Dell'Abate and Rahsaan to featuring Rahsaan and Gary Dell'Abate. While it is not officially known why Jon Hein is no longer hosting the show, it is speculated that the change is due to Jon Hein accepting a new position at SiriusXM as the Executive Producer of Howard 101.

See also
 Howard Stern
 The Howard Stern Show
 Sirius XM Radio
 Howard 100

References

External links
 Howard 100 Channel Guide
 The Howard Stern Show Official Website

American comedy radio programs
Sirius Satellite Radio
American radio programs
Howard Stern
2006 radio programme debuts